The Staten Island Sports Hall of Fame mission is "to recognize those individuals who have made extraordinary contributions to Staten Island sports history, and by virtue of their accomplishments, service, or force of character, have enriched that history for all time.”

The first Staten Island Sports Hall of Fame induction ceremony was conducted at the College of Staten Island's Williamson Theatre in 1995 when 11 recipients were honored in recognition of their noteworthy accomplishments.

Inductees

Class of 1995

 Sal Somma 
 Jim Albus 
 Terry Crowley 
 Joan Gumb 
 Abel Kiviat 
 Rich Kotite 
 Hank Majeski 
 Oscar Michaud 
 Elmer Ripley 
 Mike Siani 
 Bobby Thomson

Class of 1996

 George Bamberger 
 Andy Barberi 
 Heyward Dotson 
 John Engles
 Nick Fotiu
 Jack Hynes
 Bill Jankunis 
 Dennis McKnight 
 Bill Shakespeare 
 Sheila Tighe

Class of 1997

 Bill Britton
 Gloria Cordes Elliott 
 Jack McGinley
 Ben McNevich 
 Dominick Minicucci 
 Fred Muche
 Harry O’Brien

Class of 1998

 Larry Bearnarth 
 Dino Mangiero
 Jim Mutrie 
 Robert Pipkins 
 Hal Squier 
 Edna Hanley Strachan
 Bill Welsh

Class of 1999

 Dennis Barrett
 Bob (Sonny) Bosley 
 Mary Outerbridge 
 Jeanine Radice 
 Tom Tierney
 1964 Mid-Island Little League All Star Team

Class of 2000

 Nick Bruno 
 Carolyn Cassidy Cudone
 Frank Fernandez 
 Sue Harnett 
 James Jenkins 
 John Quinn 
 Jack Tracy
 1987 Wagner College Football Team

Class of 2001

 Dan Blaine
 Warren Fenley
 Bert Levinson 
 Matty Mcintyre 
 Tom Roche
 Claude Schoenlank 
 Vernon Turner 
 Msgr. Farrell's 1974 2-Mile Relay

Class of 2002

 Darlene Crowe 
 Karl Drews
 Charlie Marsala 
 Ken Page
 Ben Sarullo 
 Geraldine Saintilus 
 Jack Taylor

Class of 2003

 Cliff Brantley
 John D’Amato 
 Sebastian “Sonny” Grasso
 Francis “Buddy” O'Grady
 Shannon Payne
 Joe Ryan

Class of 2004

 Jack Donovan 
 Larry Napp
 Lou Marli
 1983 St. Peter's Boys’ Varsity Basketball Team

Class of 2005

 Cathy Andruzzi 
 Teddy Atlas
 Frank Genovese 
 George Genovese 
 Walter Scholl 
 Lynn Tighe
 Pete Whitehouse

Class of 2006

 Jimmy Collins 
 Sonny Logan 
 Al Paturzo
 Jim Signorile 
 John Tobin 
 John Wolyniec

Class of 2007

 Joe Andruzzi
 Al Fabbri
 Matt Galante 
 Johnny Johnson 
 Sonny Ruberto 
 Ray Rudolph

Class of 2008

 John Franco
 Sudsy Monchik 
 Kevin O’Connor 
 Fred Ragucci 
 Matty White

Class of 2009

 Nicky Anoske
 Bob Bertucci
 Artie Evans 
 Adewale Ogunleye 
 Ed Perpetua
 Lewis Sanders

Class of 2010

 Dom LaBargo 
 Jason Marquis 
 Jack Minogue 
 Mickey Sullivan 
 Tuck Turner 
 Charlie Wonsowicz

Class of 2011
 
 Kevin Coyle
 Frank Menechino

Class of 2012

 Larry Anderson 
 Dan Boylan Sr 
 Jen Derevjanik 
 Art Hall
 Kyle McAlarney
 Dan McDermott 
 Fred Olivieri

Class of 2013

 Marilyn King
 Jay Price
 Lance Olssen 
 Tony Petosa 
 Ken Strong

Class of 2014

 Aileen Aponte 
 Leon Brown 
 Bob Daggett 
 Steve Gregory 
 Frank Hannigan 
 Pete Meurer 
 Glemby (Glen) Mosley
 Bill Murtha

Class of 2015

 Bill Cali
 Vic Esposito
 Nick Kvasic 
 Frank McConville 
 Eric Olsen

Class of 2016

 Karin Muller Crowley
 John Hagemann 
 Gerry Lawless 
 Pete Pullara
 John Semerad 
 Ed Sorge
 Leslie Stahl

Class of 2017

 Mike Gilsenan 
 Ron Isler 
 Kevin Jermyn 
 Brenda Jordan 
 Karl McCoy 
 Gabe Perillo

Class of 2018

 John Drebinger 
 Cathy Morano 
 Bobby Rodriguez 
 Howie Ruppert 
 Dr. Mark Sherman 
 Staten Island Little League Founders
 Bob Steele 
 Steven F. Zuntag

Class of 2019

 Harvey Araton 
 Tony Canzoneri
 Walt Hameline 
 Tony Rafaniello 
 Anthony Varvaro
 Herb White

Class of 2020

 Nick Bilotti 
 Larry Cubas
 Frankie Genaro
 Jack Hurley
 Karen Lynch
 Rich Scheid
 Silvestri's national softball champions

Class of 2021

 No inductions

Class of 2022

 Lou Anarumo Jr.
 Julie Bowers
 Mickey Burns
 Jesse Carlin
 Greg Pedro
 James Sparrow
 Bill Wolfe

See also

 
 
 Sports in the New York metropolitan area

References

External links

 Facebook – Staten Island Sports Hall of Fame on Facebook
 Staten Island Sports Hall of Fame official site

Organizations established in 1995
Sports halls of fame

+
Staten Island
Halls of fame in New York (state)
Halls of fame in New York City
Sports museums in New York City
1995 establishments in New York City
Awards established in 1995